Thomas Wingels (born April 12, 1988) is an American former professional ice hockey forward. He played most of his career in the National Hockey League (NHL) for the San Jose Sharks, the Ottawa Senators, the Chicago Blackhawks and the Boston Bruins and retired after two seasons in the National League (NL) with Genève-Servette HC.

Playing career
As a youth, Wingels played in the 2002 Quebec International Pee-Wee Hockey Tournament with the Chicago Young Americans minor ice hockey team.

Wingels played three seasons with the Miami Redhawks of the National Collegiate Hockey Conference (NCHC). After his freshman season, he was drafted by the San Jose Sharks as the 177th pick in the 2008 NHL Entry Draft. He made his NHL debut on October 8, 2010, in San Jose's 2010–11 season opener wearing jersey number 57. Wingels scored his first career NHL goal in front of his hometown crowd in Chicago on January 15, 2012, against Chicago Blackhawks goaltender Corey Crawford. During the 2012–13 NHL lockout, Wingels would play in Finland for KooKoo.

On January 24, 2017, in the midst of his seventh season with the Sharks and having contributed 8 points in 37 games, Wingels was traded to the Ottawa Senators in exchange for Buddy Robinson, Zack Stortini and a seventh-round pick in the 2017 NHL Entry Draft.

On July 1, 2017, having left the Senators as a free agent, Wingels signed a one-year contract with the Chicago Blackhawks. On February 26, 2018, Wingels was traded to the Boston Bruins in exchange for a conditional fifth-round pick in the 2019 NHL Entry Draft.

On August 15, 2018, after eight seasons in the NHL, Wingels signed a two-year optional, CHF 1.5 million contract with Swiss club Genève-Servette HC of the National League (NL). He broke his jaw in the first regular season game with Genève-Servette, forcing him to sit out the first two months of the 2018–19 season. Wingels only appeared in 19 regular season games (18 points) with multiple injuries throughout the season. He missed the first two games of the 2019 NL playoffs before appearing in game 3 of the 1/4 final against SC Bern, scoring one goal and tallying an assist. In that game, Wingels was also guilty of a boarding against SCB's Jan Muršak which resulted in a two-game suspension and a fine of CHF 4,000. Wingels made his return to the lineup for game 6, scoring a goal with 46 seconds to go in the game to come back to 1-2, before Daniel Winnik scored the tying goal for Geneva with 29 seconds left. The game went into overtime and Mark Arcobello scored the game-winning goal for Bern after 117 minutes, in the third OT, establishing a record for the longest game ever played in the National League. Wingels only played 2 playoffs games, putting up 3 points. On April 8, 2019, Wingels agreed to a two-year contract extension with Geneva worth CHF 1.6 million. Despite a valid contract for the 2020/21 season, Wingels was released by Servette on June 5, 2020.

On June 11, 2020, Wingels' last professional team, Genève-Servette HC, announced that he decided to retire from professional hockey.

Personal life
Wingels graduated from Miami University in 2011 with a degree in accounting while playing in the American Hockey League (AHL). Wingels married his wife Molly Wingels (née Meyer) in 2014 and the two have one daughter together.

Wingels is a member of the Advisory Board for You Can Play, a campaign dedicated to fighting homophobia in sports. He has also appeared in a video supporting the campaign. He was a close friend of Brendan Burke, whose death was the catalyst for the formation of the organization. Wingels was the Sharks' nominee for the Bill Masterton Memorial Trophy in 2012, primarily for his work with You Can Play. He marched in the Chicago Pride Parade with the Chicago Gay Hockey Association on June 24, 2012.

On May 2, 2013, Wingels' work with You Can Play led him to be nominated for the NHL's King Clancy Memorial Trophy, an award given to player who best exemplifies leadership qualities on and off the ice and who has made a significant humanitarian contribution to his community.

Career statistics

Regular season and playoffs

International

Awards and honors

References

External links
 

1988 births
American men's ice hockey centers
American people of Dutch descent
Boston Bruins players
Cedar Rapids RoughRiders players
Chicago Blackhawks players
Genève-Servette HC players
Ice hockey players from Illinois
Sportspeople from Evanston, Illinois
KooKoo players
Living people
Miami RedHawks men's ice hockey players
New Trier High School alumni
Ottawa Senators players
San Jose Sharks draft picks
San Jose Sharks players
Worcester Sharks players